Gabriela Krčmářová (born 16 March 1978) is a Czech gymnast. She competed at the 1996 Summer Olympics.

References

External links
 

1978 births
Living people
Czech female artistic gymnasts
Olympic gymnasts of the Czech Republic
Gymnasts at the 1996 Summer Olympics
Sportspeople from Karviná